IPS Business School is a management college established in 2007 in Nirman Nagar, Jaipur, Rajasthan. The Institution is affiliated with Rajasthan University, Jaipur, and is approved by All India Council for Technical Education.

References

External links

Business schools in Rajasthan
Universities and colleges in Jaipur
Educational institutions established in 2007
2007 establishments in Rajasthan